Armando Gonçalves de Medeiros Fontes (born 18 January 1958) is a former Portuguese football player who played most of his career for Braga.

Club career
He made his professional debut in the Primeira Liga for Braga on 27 August 1978 as a late substitute in a 4–0 victory against Académico de Viseu. Over his career, he played 162 games and scored 36 goals in the top division of Portuguese football.

References

1958 births
Living people
People from São Miguel Island
Portuguese footballers
S.C. Lusitânia players
S.C. Braga players
G.D. Chaves players
C.D. Santa Clara players
Association football forwards